Thameslink was a train operating company in the United Kingdom owned by Govia that operated the Thameslink franchise from March 1997 until March 2006.  The franchise was due to end on 31 March 2004, but on 13 February 2004 the Strategic Rail Authority awarded Govia a two-year extension.

Services
Thameslink operated passenger services from Bedford via the Thameslink route to London Moorgate, Sutton, Wimbledon and Brighton.

Rolling stock
Thameslink inherited a fleet of 66 Class 319s from Network SouthEast.  

During 2002, Thameslink hired two Class 317s from West Anglia Great Northern for services to Moorgate. Thameslink received some extra Class 319s from Southern in 2004.  

From September 2004 until May 2005, Class 317s were hired from West Anglia Great Northern to operate Bedford to St Pancras services while the Thameslink line was severed for six months for the new St Pancras station to be built.

Depots
Thameslink's fleet was originally maintained at Selhurst Depot under sub-contract by Connex South Central/Southern.  With the Thameslink line to be severed for six months, Bedford Cauldwell depot was built in 2004.  It progressively took over all work from Selhurst.

Demise

In April 2005 the Strategic Rail Authority announced the parties shortlisted to bid for the new Thameslink Great Northern franchise, Govia not being included.  In December 2005 the Department for Transport awarded the new franchise to FirstGroup with the services operated by Thameslink transferring to First Capital Connect on 1 April 2006. However, it was announced in May 2014 that Govia had reclaimed the Thameslink franchise, which started on 14 September 2014, thus ending the First Capital Connect franchise. Govia now operates Thameslink under Govia Thameslink Railway.

See also
Thameslink (route)

References

External links

Internet archive of official site as at 30 March 2005

 
 
 
 

Defunct train operating companies
Go-Ahead Group companies
Keolis
Railway companies established in 1997
Railway companies disestablished in 2006
Railway operators in London
Rail transport in Bedfordshire
Thameslink
1997 establishments in England
2006 disestablishments in England
British companies established in 1997